Achmore is a hamlet located close to the south shore of Loch Carron, approximately  east of Plockton near Stromeferry in the historic county of Wester Ross and within the Highland council area, Scotland.

It is known for its shinty-playing family, the 'Ach' Macraes, who use the diminutive 'Ach' to distinguish themselves from other septs of Macraes in the area. Members of the family include Neil 'Ach' Macrae, his brother Johnny 'Ach' Macrae, who both played for Kinlochshiel Shinty Club, and Neil's daughter, award-winning chef and author Fenella Renwick

The only facilities within the community are a public phone box and the local Stromeferry & Achmore Village Hall mainly covering the Achmore, Stromeferry and Braeintra communities, which at the 2011 census only recorded 153 individuals. The community is served locally by the Stromeferry & Achmore Community Council.

Local children attend Auctertyre Primary School and then Plockton High School. The closest railway station is Stromeferry railway station.

External links 

 http://www.stromeferry-and-achmore.co.uk/index.asp
 http://www.lochalsh.co.uk/achmore_dairy.shtml

References 

Populated places in Lochalsh